Vieux-Manoir is a commune in the Seine-Maritime department in the Normandy region in northern France.

Geography
The A28 autoroute forms the western border of the commune. Longuerue-Vieux-Manoir station has rail connections to Rouen and Amiens.

Population

Places of interest
 The church of Notre-Dame, dating from the sixteenth century.

See also
Communes of the Seine-Maritime department

References

Communes of Seine-Maritime